Rafael Ribeiro Alves (born 18 January 1996), known as Rafael Ribeiro, is a Brazilian footballer who plays as a centre back for Vitória.

Career statistics

Honours
Náutico
Campeonato Pernambucano: 2018
Campeonato Brasileiro Série C: 2019

Notes and references
Notes

References

External links

Association football defenders
Brazilian footballers
Campeonato Brasileiro Série A players
Campeonato Brasileiro Série B players
Campeonato Brasileiro Série C players
Clube Náutico Capibaribe players
Fluminense FC players
Living people
1996 births
Footballers from Rio de Janeiro (city)